BBC Broadcasts is a box set by the English rock band Genesis. It was released on 3 March 2023 by UMG/EMI.

Background
BBC Broadcasts was announced on 12 January 2023. The set was curated by keyboardist Tony Banks and their longtime engineer and producer Nick Davis, who had also remastered the band's back catalogue for the Genesis 1970–1975, Genesis 1976–1982, and Genesis 1983–1998 box sets in 2007 and 2008.

The album was released in two formats:

5-CD edition featuring performances ranging from their 1970 lineup of Banks/Gabriel/Mayhew/Phillips/Rutherford to the 1998 tour with Ray Wilson as vocalist.
A 3-LP edition collecting highlights from the full set.

The album marks the first release of the band's 1980 Lyceum Theatre (which includes the entire "Duke Suite") and 1987 Wembley Stadium concerts in an audio-only format. Both concerts previously received releases in video formats, with the latter concert being included in The Movie Box 1981–2007. Additionally, it includes the first officially released live performances from Ray Wilson's tenure with the band.

"Shepherd", "Pacidy", and "Let Us Now Make Love" were previously released on Extra Tracks 1970–1975. Additionally, "Stagnation" first appeared on Archive 1967–75.

Track listing

CD edition

Notes

*  The released media mislabels track 1 as Shepherd and track 2 as Pacidy, however the correct song titles are vice versa.

Tracks 1–3 recorded at Studio 4 of Maida Vale Studios in Maida Vale, London on 22 February 1970.
Tracks 4–5 recorded live at the Paris Studios in London on 2 March 1972 during the Nursery Cryme tour.
Tracks 6–10 recorded at Studio T1 of the Kensington House in Shepherd's Bush, London.
Track 6 recorded 10 May 1971 during the Trespass tour.
Tracks 7 and 9 recorded 9 January 1972 during the Nursery Cryme tour.
Tracks 8 and 10 recorded 25 September 1972 during the Foxtrot tour.
Track 11 recorded live at the Empire Pool in Wembley, London on 15 April 1975 during the The Lamb Lies Down on Broadway tour.

Notes
Tracks 1–5 recorded live on 24 June 1978 during the And Then There Were Three tour.
Tracks 6–8, 10-15 recorded live on 7 May 1980, and Track 9 recorded on 6 May 1980, during the Duke tour.

Notes
Tracks 1–9 recorded live on 7 May 1980 during the Duke tour.
Tracks 10–11 recorded live on 4 July 1987 during the Invisible Touch tour.

Notes
Tracks 1–8 recorded live on 4 July 1987 during the Invisible Touch tour.
Tracks 9–10 recorded live on 25 and 26 February 1998 during the Calling All Stations tour.

Notes
All tracks recorded live on 2 August 1992 during the We Can't Dance tour.

LP edition

Notes
Track 1 recorded live at the Paris Studios in London on 2 March 1972 during the Nursery Cryme tour.
Track 2–4 recorded at Studio T1 of the Kensington House in Shepherd's Bush, London.
Track 2 recorded 10 May 1971 during the Trespass tour.
Track 3 and 4 recorded 9 January 1972 during the Nursery Cryme tour.

Notes
Track 1 recorded at Studio T1 of the Kensington House in Shepherd's Bush, London on 25 September 1972 during the Foxtrot tour.
Track 2 recorded live at the Empire Pool in Wembley, London on 15 April 1975 during the The Lamb Lies Down on Broadway tour.
Track 3 and 4 recorded live on 7 May 1980 during the Duke tour.

Notes
All tracks recorded live on 7 May 1980 during the Duke tour.

Notes
All tracks recorded live on 7 May 1980 during the Duke tour.

Notes
All tracks recorded live on 4 July 1987 during the Invisible Touch tour.

Notes
Track 1 recorded live on 4 July 1987 during the Invisible Touch tour.
Track 2 and 3 recorded live on 2 August 1992 during the We Can't Dance tour.

Personnel
Tony Banks – keyboards, backing vocals (all tracks)
Mike Rutherford – bass, guitars, backing vocals (all tracks)
Phil Collins – lead vocals (disc 2, 3, 5: all tracks, disc 4: tracks 1–8), drums, percussion (disc 1: tracks 4–11, disc 2: tracks 4–5, 9, 14–15, disc 4: tracks 2, 7–8), backing vocals (disc 1: tracks 4–11)
Peter Gabriel – lead vocals, flute (disc 1: all tracks)
Steve Hackett – guitars (disc 1: tracks 4–11)
Daryl Stuermer – guitars, bass (disc 2, 3, 5: all tracks, disc 4: tracks 1–8)
Chester Thompson – drums, percussion (disc 2, 3, 5: all tracks, disc 4: tracks 1–8)
Anthony Phillips – guitars, backing vocals (disc 1: tracks 1–3)
John Mayhew – drums, percussion (disc 1: tracks 1–3)
Ray Wilson – lead vocals (disc 4: tracks 9–10)
Nir Zidkyahu – drums, percussion (disc 4: tracks 9–10)
Anthony Drennan – bass, guitars (disc 4: tracks 9–10)

Charts

References

2023 compilation albums
Genesis (band) compilation albums
BBC Radio recordings